North Carolina elections to choose members of the Council of State (who head various executive branch departments) were held November 4, 2008. This coincided with the presidential,  U.S. Senate, U.S. House, gubernatorial, and statewide judicial elections.

Primary elections were held on May 6, 2008 for races in which more than one candidate filed for a party's nomination.

One of the results of the general election was that women held a majority (six of 10, including the Governor) of the seats on the Council of State for the first time. Only one incumbent, State Auditor Les Merritt, was defeated.

Governor of North Carolina

Governor Mike Easley term-limited, so he was not able to run for a third consecutive term as governor. Lieutenant Governor Bev Perdue won the Democratic primary, and Charlotte mayor Pat McCrory won the Republican primary. Michael Munger was the nominee of the Libertarian Party.

Purdue defeated McCrory in the general election with 50.3% of the vote to McCrory's 46.9%. Perdue was the first female governor of North Carolina.

Lieutenant Governor of North Carolina

Lt. Governor Bev Perdue was term-limited and decided to run for governor. State Senator Walter Dalton won the Democratic primary, and State Senator Robert Pittenger won the Republican primary. Phillip Rhodes was nominated by the Libertarian Party.

In the general election, Dalton defeated Pittenger. Dalton received 51.1% of the vote and Pittenger received 45.9%.

Secretary of State
Incumbent Secretary of State Elaine Marshall (Democratic) defeated attorney Jack Sawyer (Republican) on November 4, 2008.

State Auditor
Incumbent Auditor Les Merritt (Republican) was defeated by Beth Wood, Former Director of Training for the North Carolina Office of the State Auditor on November 4, 2008. Wood had previously defeated Fred Aikens, a retired state employee and retired colonel in the North Carolina Army National Guard, in the Democratic primary.  Wood won approximately 65% of the vote in the primary.

Attorney General
Incumbent Attorney General Roy Cooper (Democratic) defeated Bob Crumley (Republican), an attorney and owner of Crumley and Associates.

State Treasurer
Incumbent Richard H. Moore (Democratic) announced on May 22, 2007 that he would seek the 2008 Democratic nomination for governor.

Candidates to succeed him included three Democrats—state Sen. Janet Cowell, Michael Weisel,
and Buncombe County Commissioner David Young—and one Republican, state Rep. Bill Daughtridge.

Cowell won the Democratic primary with approximately 46 percent of the vote. Young came in second, with 36 percent.

On November 4, 2008, Janet Cowell defeated Bill Daughtridge.

Superintendent of Public Instruction
Incumbent Superintendent June Atkinson (Democratic)
won renomination by defeating North Carolina Association of Educators president Eddie Davis in the Democratic primary (with about 53 percent of the vote). Republicans Joe Johnson  and Eric H. Smith  lost to former state House co-Speaker Richard T. Morgan in the Republican primary.

On November 4, 2008, Atkinson defeated Richard Morgan.

Commissioner of Agriculture
Incumbent Commissioner Steve Troxler (Republican) defeated attorney Ronnie Ansley (Democratic).

Commissioner of Labor
Four Democrats -- Robin Anderson, chair of the State Personnel Commission, Ty Richardson, Mary Fant Donnan, a former N.C. Department of Labor official, and former Labor Commissioner John C. Brooks—filed to run against incumbent Commissioner Cherie Berry (Republican).

Mary Fant Donnan finished first, with almost 28 percent of the vote, in the May 6 primary. Brooks was the runner-up. Brooks called for a June 24 runoff, which was his right, because no candidate won more than 40 percent of the vote in the first primary. Donnan defeated Brooks in the runoff, with approximately 68 percent of the vote, becoming the Democratic nominee.

On November 4, 2008, Cherie Berry defeated Mary Fant Donnan.

Commissioner of Insurance
Incumbent Commissioner James E. Long (Democratic) surprised observers by not seeking another term. His chosen successor, assistant Commissioner and former state Rep. Wayne Goodwin, defeated David C. Smith in the Democratic primary by winning about 56 percent of the vote. John Odom, a former Raleigh city councilman, was the only Republican candidate. Mark McMains was the candidate of the Libertarian Party.

On November 4, 2008, Goodwin defeated Mark McMains and John Odom.

See also
North Carolina Council of State elections: 1996, 2000, 2004, 2012, 2016.

References

External links
News & Observer: Council of State Republican primary
News & Observer: Council of State Democratic primary
Public Policy Polling: first General Election polls of Council of State races (minus Labor Commissioner)
State Board of Elections: Primary Election Results

2008 North Carolina elections
2008
North Carolina Council of State